Makiyamaia orthopleura is a species of sea snail, a marine gastropod mollusk in the family Clavatulidae.

Description
The length of the shell attains 51 mm, its width 15.2 mm.

Distribution
This marine species occurs off KwaZulu-Natal and Transkei, South Africa

References

 Tucker JK. Catalog of Recent and fossil turrids (Mollusca, Gastropoda) Zootaxa. 2004;682:1–1295
  R.N. Kilburn, Fedosov A.E. & Olivera B.M. (2012) Revision of the genus Turris Batsch, 1789 (Gastropoda: Conoidea: Turridae) with the description of six new species. Zootaxa 3244: 1–58

External links
 

Endemic fauna of South Africa
Clavatulidae
Gastropods described in 1983